Iolaus bansana is a butterfly in the family Lycaenidae. It is found in Cameroon, Uganda and Kenya. The habitat consists of forests.

The larvae feed on Englerina woodfordioides and Oncocalyx fischeri.

Subspecies
Iolaus bansana bansana (Cameroon) 
Iolaus bansana yalae (Riley, 1928) (western Kenya, eastern Uganda)

References

Butterflies described in 1926
Iolaus (butterfly)